Laie is a census-designated place (CDP) located in the Koolauloa District on the island of Oahu in Honolulu County, Hawaii, United States. In Hawaiian,  means " leaf" ( is a climbing screwpine: Freycinetia arborea).  The population was 5,963 at the 2020 census.

History
During wartime, spears with white flags attached were set up at each end of the city of refuge. Fugitives seeking sanctuary in a city of refuge were not forced to permanently live within the confines of its walls. Instead, they were given two choices. A second option was that after a certain length of time the fugitives would be free to leave and re-enter the world unmolested. Traditional cities of refuge were abolished in 1819.

The history of  began long before European contact.

The name  becomes more environmentally significant through the Hawaiian oral history entitled . In this history, the term , which means "in the water", also belongs to the food-producing tree called . From its close association with nature through its name, and through its oral traditions and history, the community of  takes upon itself a precise identification and a responsibility in perpetuating life and in preserving all life forms. Sometimes the land itself provided sanctuary for the Hawaiian people.  was such a place. The earliest information about  states that it was a small, sparsely populated village with a major distinction: "it was a city of refuge". Within this city of refuge were located at least two , traditional Hawaiian temples, of which very little remains today.   was destroyed, but its remains can be found in taro patches  (seaward) of Laie Hawaii Temple belonging to the Church of Jesus Christ of Latter-day Saints (LDS Church). Towards the mountain, the remains of  can be found on a small ridge.

Each parcel was shaped roughly like a piece of pie with the tip in the mountains, the middle section in the foothills and coastal plain, and the broad base along the ocean front and the sea. The size and shape of the  varied. However, the purpose of these remained the same.

Latter-day Saints
A new phase of development for  began when the plantation of that name was purchased by George Nebeker, the president of the Hawaiian Mission of the LDS Church.  The Latter-day Saints in Hawaii were then encouraged to move to this location.  This purchase occurred in 1865.  The sugarcane plantation was rarely profitable, and through 1879 the church had subsidized its operations with about $40,000.

Soon after the settlement a sugar factory was built. Much of the land was used to grow sugar, but other food crops were also raised. Significantly,  was one of the few sugarcane plantations where both  (taro) and sugar were grown simultaneously. In the plantation economy of Hawaii in the late 19th century and early 20th century,  usually lost out to sugar. One of the reasons both  and sugar grew on the plantation is because of the commitment of Hawaiian plantation workers to growing their staple. Their dedication to growing  included their insistence that Saturday not be a work day on the plantation so that they could make  for their families. Both schools and church buildings were constructed in the town in the ensuing years.

Samuel E. Woolley, who served as mission president for 24 years, pushed the expansion of the operations at Laie.  In 1898 he negotiated a $50,000 loan that allowed for the building of a new pump.

Community

 is one of the best known communities of the LDS Church and the site of the Laie Hawaii Temple, the church's fifth oldest operating temple in the world. The Polynesian Cultural Center, the state's largest living museum, draws millions of visitors annually. The cultural center houses 42 acres of lush garden and water features with 6 miniature "villages" that display various cultures and traditions of the pacific islands. It offers family friendly games and shows as well as various luau and dining options. In 2015, the cultural center opened a new addition to the public called the Hukilau Marketplace. The marketplace is a vintage throwback to 1950's Hawaii offering nostalgic food, local goods and everyone-is-family hospitality. Also in 2015, the community welcomed a new "Laie Courtyard by Marriott", a three-story hotel housing 144 standard rooms which feature local island-style furnishing. The hotel replaced the historical Laie Inn which was demolished in 2009 to make room for the new hotel.

Though small,  has had a significant impact on Hawaiian culture, despite many of its residents' tracing their lineages from various Pacific Island countries such as Tonga, Samoa, Fiji, and New Zealand.  Fundraisers and feasts on the beach in the late 1940s inspired "The Hukilau Song", written, composed and originally recorded by Jack Owens, The Cruising Crooner, and made famous by Alfred Apaka.

Geography 

The coastline is marked by  Point, a prominent lithified dune jutting out into the ocean. Two other lithified dunes ( and ) lie just offshore of the point as scenic islets. lohelohe Beach Park, to the south of town, includes  Beach, named after  "John"  (1879–1944), a fisherman from  who kept his nets on the beach adjacent to  Stream.

Pahumoa Beach has also been known as Pounders Beach for its pounding shorebreak. The name was popularized in the 1950s by students at the Church College of the Pacific (now Brigham Young University–Hawaii) who called the beach "Pounders" after a shorebreak that provided popular bodysurfing rides. Pounders was the official name of the beach until it was reverted to Pahumoa in 2021.

Another bodysurfing beach is Hukilau, located at the north end of town at the mouth of  Stream.

Demographics 

As of the census of 2000, there were 4,585 people, 903 households, and 735 families residing in the CDP. The racial makeup of the CDP was 27.59% White, 0.35% Black or African American, 0.15% Native American, 9.23% Asian, 36.88% Pacific Islander, 0.65% from other races, and 25.15% from two or more races. Hispanic or Latino of any race were 3.12% of the population.

There were 903 households, out of which 46.4% had children under the age of 18 living with them, 66.2% were married couples living together, 10.9% had a female householder with no husband present, and 18.6% were non-families. 9.1% of all households were made up of individuals, and 2.1% had someone living alone who was 65 years of age or older. The average household size was 4.47 and the average family size was 4.75.

In the CDP the population was spread out, with 31.8% under the age of 18, 21.8% from 18 to 24, 26.8% from 25 to 44, 14.5% from 45 to 64, and 5.1% who were 65 years of age or older. The median age was 24 years. For every 100 females, there were 90.5 males. For every 100 females age 18 and over, there were 85.9 males.

The median income for a household in the CDP was $50,875, and the median income for a family was $59,432. Males had a median income of $40,242 versus $26,750 for females. The per capita income for the CDP was $13,785. About 10.7% of families and 17.5% of the population were below the poverty line, including 13.8% of those under the age of 18 and 11.6% of those ages 65 and older.

Education
 is within the Hawaii Department of Education.  Elementary School is in the CDP.

Brigham Young University–Hawaii is in Laie CDP.

Religion
The LDS Church's Laie Hawaii Temple is in Laie.

Notable people
 Robert Anae (born 1958), offensive coordinator for the Syracuse Orange
 Joseph Kekuku (1874–1931), inventor of steel guitar
 Neff Maiava (1924–2018), professional wrestler
 Ken Niumatalolo (born 1965), head football coach, United States Naval Academy
 Keala Settle (born 1975), actress and singer
 Manti Te'o (born 1991), American football linebacker
 Roman Salanoa (born 1997), rugby union prop
 Eni Faleomavaega Former US Representative 1989-2015

References

Further reading
 
 
 
 

Census-designated places in Honolulu County, Hawaii
Populated places on Oahu
Populated coastal places in Hawaii